James Atherton (born James Conway; 16 July 1987) is an English actor, known for his roles as Will Savage on Hollyoaks and Jamie Bowman on Coronation Street. In 2017, he appeared in the stage production of Rita, Sue and Bob Too. In 2019, he played Tim Collins in Ackley Bridge and Dr. McKenzie in the Dave sitcom Porters.

Early life
Atherton grew up in the Cumbrian village of Talkin and attended Austin Friars School in nearby Carlisle.

Career
On television, Atherton played the serial killer Will Savage in Hollyoaks from 2011 to 2015 and joined the cast of Coronation Street as Jamie Bowman in October 2015.

On stage, he co-starred as title character Bob in the Out of Joint Theatre Company's revival of Andrea Dunbar's play Rita, Sue and Bob Too, which opened at the Octagon Theatre, Bolton, in September 2017 before touring the UK, and later played at the Royal Court Theatre in January 2018. In January 2019, he appeared as Keiran in "Blindspot", an episode of the ITV crime drama Vera. Later that year, he appeared in the third series of Ackley Bridge as Tim Collins.

References

External links
 
 James Atherton on Spotlight

21st-century English male actors
People from Carlisle, Cumbria
Living people
1987 births